The Melbourne Institute of Applied Economic and Social Research (often simply referred to as "The Melbourne Institute") is an Australian economic research institute based in Melbourne, Victoria. The institute is a department of the Faculty of Business and Economics at the University of Melbourne.

History 

The Melbourne Institute was formed in 1962 as the Institute of Applied Economic Research under the leadership of Professor Ronald Henderson. It was the first economic research institute in an Australian university. Henderson built up an organisation with about 40 staff by the early 1970s. It engaged in a wide range of research areas including macroeconomic forecasting, financial economics and social economics, and is best remembered for its work on poverty and the development of the Henderson Poverty Line. The name of the institute was later changed to Institute of Applied Economic and Social Research (IAESR).

After the Henderson era, Duncan Ironmonger acted as director for five years, before Professor Peter Dixon was appointed director.

After some restructuring, the new Melbourne Institute based its operation around Dixon's ORANI model of the Australian economy. In the early 1990s Peter Dixon and a number of his senior colleagues left the institute to join Monash University. This necessitated a second period of adjustment and restructuring initiated by Professor Richard Blandy who was director from 1992 to 1994.

Professor Peter Dawkins took up his position of director in January 1996. In that year, the director and his senior management team, in association with the staff and the advisory board, developed a strategic plan with the unifying theme being the link between economic performance and social outcomes. The first version of this plan was for the period 1996–2000 and it is updated annually. In that year, the name of the institute was changed to Melbourne Institute: Applied Economic & Social Research.

Professor John Freebairn was appointed director in 2005 and returned to the Department of Economics in 2007. Stephen Sedgwick, former board member of the Asian Development Bank was director from August 2007 until July 2009. In April 2010 Professor Deborah Cobb-Clark was appointed the director and Ronald Henderson Professor. In 2016, Professor A. Abigail Payne was appointed director and Ronald Henderson Professor.

Current activities
The Melbourne Institute manages the Household, Income and Labour Dynamics in Australia (HILDA) household panel survey, a national longitudinal study of household economies, labour force participation and family change. It is also undertaking a panel study of General practitioners examining the determinants of medical workforce shortages, undertakes detailed labour market research, is examining the relationship of poverty and human capital and examines the economic impacts of intellectual property. The institute produces regular reports which track consumer sentiment and economic activity (both reports get widespread media comment in Australia), and annual rankings of the standing of Australian Universities and of individual disciplines. The institute and The Australian newspaper present the Economic and Social Outlook Conference.

References

External links 
 

Organisations based in Melbourne
Research institutes in Melbourne
Economic research institutes
Political and economic think tanks based in Australia
1962 establishments in Australia
Think tanks established in 1962
University of Melbourne